Grove Mansion, also known as the Green, earlier Townsend, Residence is a historic home located at Maytown in East Donegal Township, Lancaster County, Pennsylvania. It was built between 1882 and 1887, and is a three-story, three bay by four bay brick dwelling in the Second Empire style.  It features a "bell cast" mansard roof with patterned red and gray slate.  Also on the property are a contributing pony house and carriage house, both topped with elaborate cupolas.

It was listed on the National Register of Historic Places in 1983.

References 

Houses on the National Register of Historic Places in Pennsylvania
Second Empire architecture in Pennsylvania
Houses completed in 1887
Houses in Lancaster County, Pennsylvania
National Register of Historic Places in Lancaster County, Pennsylvania